Chilcoot-Vinton is a census-designated place (CDP) in Plumas County, California, United States. The population was 454 at the 2010 census, up from 387 at the 2000 census.

Geography
Chilcoot-Vinton is located at  (39.800609, -120.144398).

Chilcoot and Vinton are actually two separate small communities that are two miles apart on State Route 70, but were grouped together by the USCB for statistical purposes.

Frenchman Lake, Plumas County, California is a nearby recreation area known for its fishing, camping and water sports and is the largest contributor to the economies of Vinton and Chilcoot.

Climate
Chilcoot-Vinton has a dry-summer continental climate (Dsb) according to the Köppen climate classification system.

Demographics

2010
The 2010 United States Census reported that Chilcoot-Vinton had a population of 454. The racial makeup of Chilcoot-Vinton was 418 (92.1%) White, 1 (0.2%) African American, 4 (0.9%) Native American, 1 (0.2%) Asian, 0 (0.0%) Pacific Islander, 9 (2.0%) from other races, and 21 (4.6%) from two or more races. Hispanic or Latino of any race were 38 persons (8.4%).

The Census reported that 454 people (100% of the population) lived in households, 0 (0%) lived in non-institutionalized group quarters, and 0 (0%) were institutionalized.

There were 196 households, out of which 49 (25.0%) had children under the age of 18 living in them, 101 (51.5%) were opposite-sex married couples living together, 10 (5.1%) had a female householder with no husband present, 12 (6.1%) had a male householder with no wife present.  There were 8 (4.1%) unmarried opposite-sex partnerships, and 1 (0.5%) same-sex married couples or partnerships. 64 households (32.7%) were made up of individuals, and 28 (14.3%) had someone living alone who was 65 years of age or older. The average household size was 2.32.  There were 123 families (62.8% of all households); the average family size was 2.93.

The population was spread out, with 91 people (20.0%) under the age of 18, 39 people (8.6%) aged 18 to 24, 92 people (20.3%) aged 25 to 44, 165 people (36.3%) aged 45 to 64, and 67 people (14.8%) who were 65 years of age or older.  The median age was 45.6 years. For every 100 females, there were 113.1 males.  For every 100 females age 18 and over, there were 109.8 males.

There were 248 housing units at an average density of 18.8 per square mile (7.3/km2), of which 153 (78.1%) were owner-occupied, and 43 (21.9%) were occupied by renters. The homeowner vacancy rate was 5.0%; the rental vacancy rate was 12.2%.  341 people (75.1% of the population) lived in owner-occupied housing units and 113 people (24.9%) lived in rental housing units.

2000
As of the census of 2000, there were 387 people, 163 households, and 101 families residing in the CDP. There were 202 housing units at an average density of 15.3 per square mile (5.9/km2). The racial makeup of the CDP was 95.09% White, 0.26% Black or African American, 0.52% Native American, 0.52% Pacific Islander, 3.10% from other races, and 0.52% from two or more races.  5.17% of the population were Hispanic or Latino of any race.

There were 163 households, out of which 30.7% had children under the age of 18 living with them, 52.1% were married couples living together, 6.1% had a female householder with no husband present, and 38.0% were non-families. 36.2% of all households were made up of individuals, and 8.0% had someone living alone who was 65 years of age or older.  The average household size was 2.37 and the average family size was 3.12.

In the CDP, the population was spread out, with 28.7% under the age of 18, 4.7% from 18 to 24, 25.1% from 25 to 44, 32.8% from 45 to 64, and 8.8% who were 65 years of age or older.  The median age was 39 years. For every 100 females, there were 101.6 males.  For every 100 females age 18 and over, there were 112.3 males.

The median income for a household in the CDP was $35,938, and the median income for a family was $39,583. Males had a median income of $42,361 versus $21,406 for females. The per capita income for the CDP was $17,355.  About 10.0% of families and 12.0% of the population were below the poverty line, including 9.0% of those under age 18 and none of those age 65 or over.

Politics

See also

 List of places in California

References

External links

 Aerial Photography 

Census-designated places in Plumas County, California
Census-designated places in California